Laila Boonyasak, or formerly Chermarn Boonyasak, nickname Ploy, is a Thai film and television actress and model. She is well known for her role as June/Tang in the movie The Love of Siam. Her other film roles have included the title ghost character in director Yuthlert Sippapak's horror-comedies Buppah Rahtree and Buppah Rahtree Phase 2: Rahtree Returns. She was also featured in Pen-Ek Ratanaruang's Last Life in the Universe, in which she portrayed the younger sister of the character played by her real-life older sister, Daran Boonyasak.

Biography 
In 2014, Chermarn has joined forces with the UN Refugee Agency and celebrities around the world to help spread the message of World Refugee Day.

She's also a mentor on the modelling-themed reality series The Face Thailand season 1 and The Face Thai and season 4 All Stars, aired on Channel 3.

Filmography

Television

TV Series

TV Program

TVC/Presenter

Awards

References

External links

 

Living people
1982 births
Laila Boonyasak
Converts to Protestantism from Buddhism
Laila Boonyasak
Laila Boonyasak
Laila Boonyasak
Laila Boonyasak
Laila Boonyasak
Laila Boonyasak
Laila Boonyasak